The 1960 Tangerine Bowl (January) was an American college football bowl game played on January 1, 1960, at the Tangerine Bowl stadium in Orlando, Florida. It was the first of two Tangerine Bowls played in calendar year 1960.

Statistics

Scoring summary

References

Tangerine Bowl
1959 NAIA football season
Citrus Bowl (game)
Presbyterian Blue Hose football bowl games
Middle Tennessee Blue Raiders football bowl games
1960 in sports in Florida
Tangerine Bowl